Mississippi Highway 366 (MS 366) is a short highway in northeastern Mississippi. The road starts at MS 25 in Belmont, and travels southeastward through Golden to the Alabama state border. The route was created in 1958, and hasn't changed significantly since.

Route description

All of the route is in Tishomingo County. MS 366 starts at MS 25 in Belmont, locally known as Second Street. The route travels southeastward out of the town, through farmland and small areas of trees. At Searcy Road, MS 366 travels along a railway owned by Redmont Railway. The road soon enters the village of Golden. Near the center of the village, the route intersects the eastern terminus of MS 760. MS 366 then crosses over the railroad and temporarily travels east. Past Bear Creek Road, the route curved southeastward, intersecting a few more county roads. After passing County Road 78, MS 366 ends at the Alabama state line. The road continues as Fourth Street Northwest into Red Bay.

In 2013, Mississippi Department of Transportation (MDOT) calculated as many as 3,900 vehicles traveling east of Long Street, and as few as 2,800 vehicles traveling south of Shady Cove. The route is legally defined in Mississippi Code § 65-3-3. MS 366 is maintained by MDOT.

History
In 1958, a new road in southeastern Tishomingo County was designated MS 366. The new, paved route started from MS 25 and ended at the Alabama state line. The road has not changed significantly since.

Major intersections

References

366